The Kingman Army Air Forces Flexible Gunnery School Radio Tower, at 7000 Flightline Dr. in Kingman, Arizona is a historic structure built by the U.S. Army Corps of Engineers in 1943.  It is a steel radio tower that has also been known as Kingman Army Air Field Radio Tower and as Storage Depot #41 Radio Tower.  It was listed on the National Register of Historic Places in 1999.

Flexible Gunnery School.  It has a  "cab" with a hip roof.  In 1988, the cab was empty and the tower was surrounded by fencing.

It was believed to be one of only two ATCs of its type surviving in the United States.

It is located in what in 1988 was known as the Kingman Airport and Industrial Park.

References 

Government buildings completed in 1943
Buildings and structures in Kingman, Arizona
Radio masts and towers in the United States
Air traffic control
Military facilities on the National Register of Historic Places in Arizona
Towers in Arizona
National Register of Historic Places in Kingman, Arizona
World War II on the National Register of Historic Places
1943 establishments in Arizona
Towers completed in 1943